The Broxbourne Council election, 2008 was held to elect council members of the Broxbourne Borough Council, a local government authority in Hertfordshire, England.

Composition of expiring seats before election

Election results

Results summary 

An election was held in 12 wards on 1 May 2008. (No election in Rosedale Ward)

This was the first Local Government Election in Broxbourne where the British National Party fielded a "full slate" of candidates

The Labour Party gained 1 seat from the Conservative Party in Waltham Cross Ward.

The new political balance of the council following this election was:

Conservative 35 seats
Labour 3 seats

The next Local Government Election will be held on 6 May 2010 when seats will be contested in all of the 13 wards.

Ward results

References

2008
2008 English local elections
2000s in Hertfordshire